Radyo 2, also known as TRT FM, is a radio network of TRT. This network is specialized on Turkish pop music.

Technical details 

Radyo 2 was the first radio network in Turkey to broadcast on FM. Below are the frequencies of some Radyo 2 transmitters. The ERP power of these transmitters are 50 kW or more.

References

External links 

   

Turkish radio networks
Turkish Radio and Television Corporation